Brad Miller (born 1981) is an American professional chef and TV personality. He is the host of the Cooking Channel’s Food Truck Nation. He was a contestant on Season 3 of the Fox Network reality TV show Hell’s Kitchen, finishing 6th.

Miller was born and raised in Ottawa, Illinois, a suburb located southwest of Chicago. He graduated from Le Cordon Bleu Culinary Institute of Scottsdale in Arizona. He is the chef and partner at Inn of The Seventh Ray in Topanga, California, and executive chef of Five Star Senior Living, an organization that operates residential senior communities.

References 

Chefs from California
American television chefs
Alumni of Le Cordon Bleu
Chefs from Illinois
1981 births
Living people